Ushan Çakır (born 23 May 1984) is a Turkish actor. He became known for the character Arda he played in hit surreal comedy Leyla and Mecnun in 2011. Ushan Çakır graduated from Istanbul State Conservatory and has participated in a number of dramatic performances as well as playing theater.

Filmography

Theater
  : Fuat Mete - Krek - 2013 / 2014
 The Gingerbread House : Mark Schultz - Tiyatro Yan Etki - 2012
 Korku Tüneli : Philip Ridley - Tiyatro Sıfır Nokta İki - 2010
 Some Voices : Joe Penhall - Tiyatro Sıfır Nokta İki - 2010
 At Sea : Sławomir Mrożek - Kent Oyuncuları - 2007
 Line : Israel Horovitz - Kent Oyuncuları - 2007
 Anna Karenina : Leo Tolstoy/Helen Edmundson - Kent Oyuncuları - 2006

Awards
20th Sadri Alışık Theater and Cinema Awards - The Most Successful Theater Actor of the Year in a Supporting Role (Drama) (Göl Kıyısı, Talimhane Tiyatrosu)
2016 - 20th Afife Theater Awards, "Most Successful Actor of the Year in a Supporting Role" (Göl Kıyısı)

References

1984 births
Living people
People from Karşıyaka
Turkish male film actors
Turkish male television actors
Turkish male stage actors
21st-century Turkish male actors